The Amax Eagle TT is an Australian autogyro that was designed and produced by Amax Engineering of Donvale, Victoria, introduced in the 1990s. Now out of production, when it was available the aircraft was supplied as a kit for amateur construction.

The "TT" designation indicates "Tall Tail". The aircraft has higher landing gear, allowing the engine to be placed on the vertical center of gravity, which eliminates pitch changes with throttle application.

Design and development
The Eagle TT was derived from the low-landing gear equipped Amax Eagle and was designed to comply with amateur-built aircraft rules. It features a single main rotor, a single-seat open cockpit without a windshield, tricycle landing gear without wheel pants and a four-cylinder, liquid-cooled, four-stroke, single-ignition  Subaru EA81 automotive engine in pusher configuration.

The aircraft fuselage is made from welded 4130 steel tubing with some aluminum parts.

The manufacturer estimated the construction time from the supplied kit as 100 hours.

Specifications (Eagle TT)

See also
List of rotorcraft

References

Eagle TT
1990s Australian sport aircraft
1990s Australian ultralight aircraft
Homebuilt aircraft
Single-engined pusher autogyros